The African sandhopper (Afrotridactylus usambaricus) is a species of pygmy mole cricket found throughout Africa south of the Sahara Desert. It prefers sandy or muddy open river banks. It has been recorded from Niokolo-Koba National Park in Senegal.

References

Caelifera
Insects of Africa
Insects described in 1910